Leptostylopsis puntacanaensis is a species of longhorn beetles of the subfamily Lamiinae. It was described by Lingafelter and Micheli in 2009. It is found in the Dominican Republic.

References

Acanthocinini
Beetles described in 2009